The Neoplan Transliner was a series of related public transport single-decker bus models introduced by Neoplan USA in 1981 and produced until the company declared bankruptcy in 2006.

Models 
The Neoplan USA Transliner was available in a wide variety of body styles. Transliner could be ordered in 26', 30', 35', 40', and 60' lengths. Standard (high), completely low, or semi-low (with steps to access the rear section after the rear doors) floors were available.

An unrelated over-the-road coach was marketed by Neoplan GmbH starting in the 1990s for the European market, also named Transliner.

Notes

Originally, the Transliner could only be ordered in standard (high) floor form. The low-floor variants were introduced in 1999, with Port Authority of Allegheny County (PAT) being the lead agency for mass-produced examples. The "true low floor" variants (AN440TLF and AN445TLF) were also known as Intraliners, available in  nominal lengths and mostly used by airports.

Unique variants included the AN440LF-ETB trolleybuses produced for Massachusetts Bay Transportation Authority (MBTA), featuring a third passenger door on the street (driver's) side, the DMA-460LF dual-mode buses for the Silver Line (MBTA) with trolley poles and a diesel engine, the AN440/3 3-axle variant with a dead third axle for Los Angeles County Metropolitan Transportation Authority (LACMTA), and the  shortened AN460RC (aka AN459) built for New Jersey Transit (NJT).

Design 

Notes

Construction 
Self-supporting monocoque steel construction made of seamless square steel tubes, electrically welded. Exterior roof and side wall panels are of double galvanized steel, sealed to the skeleton with a combination of spot welding and gluing. Stainless steel wheelhousings and stepwells.

Seating 
Depending on the model and length, seats were offered for up to 37 (AN440LF), 43 (AN440), or 65 passengers (AN460/AN460LF).

Engines 

NeoPlan offered a variety of engines, both diesel and CNG fueled. Depending upon the model, Detroit Diesel Series 40, 50, or the 6V92TA; Cummins ISM, C-series, or ISL; or CAT C-9 engines could also be had. Most Transliners featured Allison B400 or B500 "World Transmissions". However, ZF (4HP590) and Voith transmissions were also available on some models.

History 
The first transit buses sold by Neoplan USA were based on the  buses developed for VöV under the Standard-Linienbus program. Accordingly, the first buses ordered from Neoplan USA were called the Atlantis and internally N-416-xx (with xx designating nominal length in feet); these were purchased by Metropolitan Atlanta Rapid Transit Authority (MARTA, 50× 40-foot models) and Milwaukee County Transit System (MCTS, 26× 40-foot and 18× 35-foot models) and delivered in 1981 and 1982.

Neoplan USA was also offering the "Advanced Design" N412 bus to compete with the GM Rapid Transit Series and Flxible Metro. By 1982, these buses had been given the name "Transliner" and the model numbers had been established as the AN435 and AN440 (for American Neoplan, Model 4, 35 or 40-foot lengths, respectively). Significant early Transliner sales included 1,000 buses to 16 transit agencies in the state of Pennsylvania, coordinated by PennDOT in 1982, which was the largest single bus contract in the U.S. to date, 50 articulated buses to MARTA, 76 buses to Washington Metropolitan Area Transit Authority (WMATA) in 1983, and 415 buses to LACMTA, then operating as the Southern California Rapid Transit District (SCRTD), in 1984 to support crowds expected for the 1984 Summer Olympics.

Pennsylvania won a commitment from Neoplan USA to build an assembly plant in the state as a condition to fulfill the order; Neoplan USA announced its intent to add a Pennsylvania factory in 1982 and revealed a scale model of the site chosen in Honey Brook in 1984, but assembled all of the Pennliners in Lamar due to the delivery deadlines. The first bus completed for PAT, #3500, has been preserved by the Antique Motor Coach Association of Pennsylvania since March 2000. Although the Honey Brook site assembled buses briefly in 1986, it would later become the headquarters of Neopart, Neoplan USA's part distribution operation. A third Neoplan USA factory operated for approximately a year from June 2001 to June 2002 in Brownsville, Texas.

Issues
Joseph Alexander, a member of the WMATA board, criticized the 1983 contract award to Neoplan USA; Alexander was also serving as the president of the American Public Transportation Association (APTA), which had received negative feedback from MCTS. One MCTS official called Neoplan USA "totally disorganized" and lacking quality control. Cracks were discovered in the frames of WMATA and SCRTD buses in 1984, and those agencies suspended service with their Neoplan USA buses in 1985, just ahead of a nationwide voluntary recall in March. That recall was also driven by a December 1984 incident where a faulty defroster on a WMATA bus led to an electrical fire and subsequent evacuation.

The PennDOT buses, nicknamed "Pennliners", also were prone to premature corrosion, as experienced by the Port Authority of Allegheny County (PAT). Extensive corrosion issues led to a $1.7 million settlement between Neoplan USA and PAT in 1990.

Another PAT order for low-floor AN440LF buses, which were delivered starting in August 1999, were pulled from service by September 2000 for frame cracks. During federally mandated STURAA testing in 1994–95, a prototype AN440LF experienced extensive frame and suspension cracking. Neoplan USA entered an agreement to pay for all frame repairs to the low-floor models. Multiple AN440LF buses delivered to the Massachusetts Bay Transportation Authority in 2005 were damaged by the same pothole; traveling over the pothole cracked the torque rods connecting the suspension and steering, and two crashes occurred as a direct consequence of steering issues. Additional cracks in suspension components were discovered in 2006 and 2007.

Deployment 
The 40-foot buses were made for over 50 transportation networks all over the United States.  The bus networks that have or have had them in service include MBTA in Boston, Massachusetts; SEPTA in Philadelphia, Pennsylvania; WMATA in Washington, D.C.; ABQ RIDE in Albuquerque, New Mexico and LACMTA in Los Angeles, California.

Pennsylvania
In late 1983 through 1985, Neoplan USA delivered the order for over 1,000 "Pennliner" buses for the state of Pennsylvania. The 1982 contract was a pooled purchase from 16 different transit agencies, with the majority going to SEPTA in Philadelphia (450) and Port Authority of Allegheny County (PAT) in Pittsburgh (410).

Philadelphia
By 1989, SEPTA, the largest transportation network in Pennsylvania, had purchased a cumulative total of 1,092 Neoplan AN435 and AN440 buses. As they aged, they were replaced by American Ikarus and New Flyer Low Floor buses that entered service between 1996 and 2005. The remaining 35 Neoplan AN440s (EZ models) were sent to the SEPTA Frankford Depot to temporarily replace the 1979 AM General Trolleybuses that were retired in 2004; the AN440s in turn were retired on June 20, 2008 after the final delivery of the replacement New Flyer E40LFR trolleybuses.

SEPTA also ordered 155 Neoplan AN460s from 1998-2000 to replace their aging Volvo B10M articulated buses and about 60 AN460 high floor buses were in service until 2017, when they were replaced by Novabus LFS Artic articulated buses.

Pittsburgh
PAT received its first Pennliners in October 1982; the agency later ordered AN460s (articulated) and AN440LFs (low-floor) versions from Neoplan USA.

PAT retired its last two Neoplan buses (AN460s) in December 2019 by providing free rides around downtown Pittsburgh for one weekend.

Washington, D.C.
In the 1980s, both PAT and WMATA, also known as Metro, discovered frame cracking issues with their Neoplan USA buses. However, they both later operated additional Neoplan buses, with WMATA ordering the AN460, a 60-foot articulated version.

San Francisco
AN440 and AN460 models were ordered by the San Francisco Municipal Railway (Muni) to replace their aging bus fleet and delivered starting in 2001, but they proved troublesome. Among the problems were insufficient, excessively noisy cooling fans (sounds reached up to 90 dB), faulty transmissions, maintenance intensive brake systems (requiring service every ), and cracking frames. The problems were compounded when Neoplan eventually refused to fix the problems, instead choosing to repossess the remaining spare parts and abruptly abandon its San Francisco overhaul yard in September 2005.

The Muni Neoplan USA buses are unique in that they have rear windows, with the air conditioning unit mounted on the roof.

St. Louis
Bi-State Development Agency, dba Metro, has a small fleet of Neoplan Buses for its MetroBus service, and since March 30, 2009, has retired them.

See also 

 List of buses

References

Bus test reports

External links 
www.neoplan.de — Neoplan in Germany
The History Of The Neoplan Order at SEPTA

AN440
Buses of the United States
Single-deck buses
Articulated buses
Natural gas vehicles
Vehicles introduced in 1981